The Bangladesh women's cricket team toured New Zealand in December 2022 to play three One Day International (ODI) and three Twenty20 International (T20I) matches. The ODI matches formed part of the 2022–2025 ICC Women's Championship.

New Zealand bowled Bangladesh out for 32 runs in the first T20I and won the match by 132 runs – their biggest win in the format. New Zealand also won the second T20I, thanks to a record 77-run partnership between Amelia Kerr and Maddy Green. Amelia Kerr starred once again in the third T20I to help New Zealand complete a 3–0 sweep of Bangladesh.

Bangladesh lost the opening ODI after getting bowled out for 180, despite a career-best innings of 73 runs by Nigar Sultana. Jess Kerr's four-wicket haul led New Zealand to an eight-wicket victory in the match. The second ODI was washed out after multiple rain breaks before and during the match. New Zealand won the ODI series 1–0 after the third ODI was also washed out, this time after only 26.5 overs of play. The final ODI was the seventh international cricket fixture hosted in New Zealand to get washed out in 2022 – a record number for New Zealand in a calendar year.

Squads

Brooke Halliday was ruled out of New Zealand's squad for the entire series due to a hand injury; Rebecca Burns was named as a replacement in the T20I squad, while Georgia Plimmer was added to the ODI squad.

Warm-up matches
Before the start of the series, Bangladesh faced a New Zealand XI in a 50-over and a 20-over warm-up match.

T20I series

1st T20I

2nd T20I

3rd T20I

ODI series

1st ODI

2nd ODI

3rd ODI

References

External links
 Series home at ESPNcricinfo

2022 in New Zealand cricket
2022 in Bangladeshi cricket
International cricket competitions in 2022–23
Bangladesh 2022-23
Bangladeshi cricket tours of New Zealand